David Robin Charles Trendell (17 August 1964, in Tavistock, Devon, England – 28 October 2014) was the English organist, lecturer and Director of Music at King's College London. He specialised in the music of William Byrd.

Education
Trendell was a chorister at Norwich Cathedral before being offered a choral scholarship to King's College, Cambridge and an organ scholarship to Exeter College, Oxford. He chose the latter.

Career
Trendell began his career as assistant organist at Winchester College. In 1989, he moved to Oxford and was appointed Organist at University Church of St Mary the Virgin and thereafter was Tutor at St Hugh's, St Hilda's and Oriel colleges. He arrived at King's College London in 1992 as Director of Chapel Choir and lecturer in Music and remained there until his death in October 2014. While at King's, he was credited in bringing to prominence the chapel choir. The choir regularly broadcast with BBC Radio 3 for evensong. Beyond college life, he was also director of music at St Bartholomew-the-Great, Smithfield and later Director of Music at St Mary's, Bourne Street, London.

Recordings

2000 - Missa Corona Spinea - John Taverner, Choir of King's College London directed by David Trendell, Sanctuary Gaudeamus
2002 - Missa Simile est regnum caelorum, Missa O rex gloriae and Lamentations - Alonso Lobo, Choir of King's College London directed by David Trendell on Sanctuary Gaudeamus
2005 - Sebastian de Vivanco. Missa Crux Fidelis. Motets, Choir of King's College London directed by David Trendell, Sanctuary Gaudeamus
2010 - Philippe Rogier. Missa Ego sum qui sum. Motets - Philippe Rogier, Choir of King's College London, directed by David Trendell, Hyperion Records
2012 - Missa In Lectulo Meo, Missa Christus Resurgens, Miserere, Motets - Gregorio Allegri, Choir of King's College London, directed by David Trendell, Delphian Records
 2013 - Deutsche Motette - German Romantic Choral Music from Schubert to Strauss, Choirs of Gonville & Caius College and King's College London, directed by Geoffrey Webber and David Trendell, Delphian Records
 2014 - Messe de Requiem - Alfred Desenclos, Choir of King's College London, directed by David Trendell, Delphian Records

References

External links
 Obituary, Daily Telegraph
 King's College London profile

1964 births
2014 deaths
Alumni of King's College, Cambridge
Alumni of Exeter College, Oxford
Musicians from Tavistock
English classical organists
British male organists
Cathedral organists
English choral conductors
British male conductors (music)
Deaths from intracranial aneurysm
Male classical organists